Six-Part Seating is a sculpture by Scott Burton, installed at the National Gallery of Art Sculpture Garden in Washington, D.C. The work, conceived in 1985 and fabricated in 1998, consists of six polished red granite seats that can be arranged in a circle or side by side. The seats weigh approximately 1500 pounds each. Visitors are welcome to sit on the seats. The work was given to the National Gallery of Art by the Collectors Committee.

See also

 List of public art in Washington, D.C., Ward 2

References

External links
 Six-Part Seating (National Gallery of Art)

1990s sculptures
Collections of the National Gallery of Art
Granite sculptures in Washington, D.C.
National Gallery of Art Sculpture Garden
Outdoor sculptures in Washington, D.C.